The Kopin Corporation is a Westborough, Massachusetts-based electronics manufacturer, best known for its display devices for mobile electronics.

Microdisplays
President John C.C. Fan describes the company's growth strategy as being based on expanding the range of applications for microdisplays.

Kopin has attempted to combat the trend of digital cameras being released without viewfinders through the development of tiny electronic displays, aimed at inclusion in higher-end cameras rather than budget models. Kopin's first CyberDisplay product debuted in 1999 in a JVC digital camera; it featured a 320x240 pixel display with a  diagonal measurement. In 2007, the Olympus Corporation chose a Kopin CyberDisplay with QVGA-level resolution for inclusion as a viewfinder in its SP-550 UZ model.

Outside of the consumer market, Kopin's microdisplays have also been used in electronics devices aimed at the military and law enforcement officers. In 2008, the United States Army awarded Kopin with the first phase of a $4.2 million program aimed at producing microdisplays more quickly and improving their performance, with the aim of incorporating them in night vision devices. In 2009, Kopin introduced its Golden-i headset computer, aimed at firefighters and security professionals. NBC reporter Monica J. Vila named the 2013 version of the Golden-i it as one of her favorite devices introduced at the Consumer Electronics Show that year, even though it was not aimed at the consumer market. Later that year there was speculation that Kopin might enter into a deal with Microsoft or Apple to provide components for any optical head-mounted display product those companies might manufacture to compete with Google Glass, after Google chose Kopin's competitor Himax to supply components for Google Glass; however, analyst Karl Guttag stated to Seeking Alpha that he saw this as unlikely.

Other products
Kopin also manufactures heterojunction bipolar transistors. Among its customers for this product line is Woburn, Massachusetts-based Skyworks Solutions.

Acquisitions
In January 2011, Kopin acquired British optoelectronics company Forth Dimension Displays (FDD) for £7 million in cash. Kopin's president John Fan indicated in media comments that Kopin was especially interested in FDD's ultra-high resolution reflective microdisplays and time domain imaging technology.

Controversy
In July 1999, Neil Bush, (son to President George H. W. Bush and brother to President George W. Bush) made at least $798,000 on three stock trades in a single day of Kopin Corp. where he had been employed as a consultant. The company announced on the same day good news about a new Asian client that sent its stock value soaring. Bush stated that he had no inside knowledge and that his financial advisor had recommended the trades. He said, "any increase in the price of the stock on that day was purely coincidental, meaning that I did not have any improper information."
When asked in January 2004 about the stock trades, Bush contrasted the capital gains he reported in 1999 and 2000 with the capital losses on Kopin stock he reported ($287,722 in all) in 2001. In 2001 Kopin joined a broad decline in high-tech stock valuations.

References

External links

Electronics companies of the United States
Manufacturing companies based in Massachusetts
Taunton, Massachusetts